Gilbert Henry Miller (17 August 1903 – 14 October 1944) was an  Australian rules footballer who played with South Melbourne in the Victorian Football League (VFL).

Notes

External links 

1903 births
1944 deaths
Australian rules footballers from Melbourne
Sydney Swans players
People from Carlton, Victoria